Ghost Opera is the eighth studio album from metal band Kamelot.  It was released in 2007 by SPV GmbH/Steamhammer Records, on June 1 in Germany and followed by releases on June 4 in Europe and June 5 in the United States.  It is the first studio album by Kamelot to feature keyboardist Oliver Palotai, and the last with bassist Glenn Barry. The album spawned four music videos for the songs "Ghost Opera", "The Human Stain", "Rule the World" and "Love You to Death".

On Billboard 200, the album peaked at number 18 on Top Heatseekers and number 48 on Independent Albums.

Prior to the release of the album, SPV Records distributed a strictly limited CD single of "Ghost Opera", handed out to fans attending the European Tour in March, April and May 2007. The album was released on vinyl in the spring of 2009, along with The Black Halo.

Track listing
All songs written by Kamelot.

Limited edition CD + DVD and The Second Coming
In 2008, a reissue of Ghost Opera entitled Ghost Opera: The Second Coming was released on March 28 in Germany, March 31 for the rest of Europe and April 8 in the United States and Canada. The album was released as a double-disc set, with the first disc featuring Ghost Opera as previously released, and the videos for "The Human Stain" and "Memento Mori", filmed in Belgrade, Serbia. The second disc contained 10 live tracks from the same show, as well as three bonus tracks from Ghost Opera and The Black Halo and a remix of "Rule the World".

Charts

Personnel
Credits for Ghost Opera adapted from liner notes.

Kamelot
 Roy Khan – vocals, keyboards
 Thomas Youngblood – guitars
 Glenn Barry – bass
 Casey Grillo – drums, percussion
 Oliver Palotai – keyboards

Additional personnel
 Miro – orchestrations, keyboards, engineering
 Simone Simons – female vocals on "Blücher"
 Amanda Somerville – female vocals on "Mourning Star", "Love You to Death", "Season's End" and "Ghost Opera"
 Sascha Paeth – additional guitars, engineering

Ghost Opera Choir
 Cinzia Rizzo, Robert Hunecke-Rizzo, Thomas Rettke

Personnel
 Olaf Reitmeier – engineering
 Simon Oberender – engineering
 Bredo Myrvang – recording
 Mattias Norén – artwork, layout
 Elin Strigå – photo editing
 Alexandra V Bach – artwork
 Liliana Sanches – photography

References

2007 albums
Kamelot albums
SPV/Steamhammer albums